Adrian Paul Lucas, b. 1962 is an English organist, tutor and composer.

He became organist and director of music at Worcester Cathedral in 1996 and artistic director of the Worcester Three Choirs Festival. Previously he had been assistant organist at Norwich Cathedral (1983–90) before becoming organist and master of the choristers at Portsmouth Cathedral (1990–96).

Lucas was born in Essex in 1962, attended Southend High School for Boys and graduated from St John's College, Cambridge, where he was organ scholar from 1980 to 1983 under Dr George Guest. During this time he toured regularly with the chapel choir in France, the Netherlands, Germany, Belgium, Sweden, Greece, and Australia. He also recorded a number of discs whilst at St Johns, including repertoire by Allegri, Gibbons, and Titelouze.

Whilst at Norwich, he taught piano and organ for the University of East Anglia and was a member of the music staff at both Norwich High School and Norwich School. He was musical director of the Wymondham Choir (a 50-strong freelance choir of men and boys) with whom he toured, performing in many English cathedrals as well as a concert tour in and around Koblenz in Germany. He also co-presented the radio programme Norfolk Arts for the local radio station BBC Radio Norfolk.

During his time at Portsmouth, he was responsible for the building of the new Nicholson & Co (Worcester) Ltd organ (1994), as well as directing the cathedral choir in the drumhead service to commemorate the 50th anniversary of D-Day. During this time, he also conducted the choir for numerous broadcasts on both TV and radio and recorded their first ever CD with Priory Records.

Whilst at Worcester Cathedral, he made several recordings with the cathedral choir, as well as launching the Great Cathedral Organ series for Regent Records. In 2008 a major project was completed when the new Kenneth Tickell organ came into service in the quire of the cathedral. His first recording on the new instrument included the Julius Reubke Sonata and Louis Vierne's First Symphony. He also conducted the Worcester Festival Choral Society

At the end of 2011 he left his cathedral post to work as a freelance organist, conductor and composer, as well as starting up his own recording company, Acclaim Productions.
On 16 June 2018 he returns to his old school to give a recital on its newly-rebuilt organ.

References

Sources 
Who's Who, 2008. .

External links 
 Review: Adrian Lucas conducts the Philharmonia Orchestra in Holst's Planets Suite in Gloucester Cathedral
 Great Cathedral Anthems vol XII
 Worcester Cathedral
 Worcester Cathedral Choir on Boysoloist.com
 Kenneth Tickell Organs
 Three Choirs Festival
 City of Birmingham Choir
 Worcester Festival Choral Society
 Worcester Festival Choral Society reviews

1962 births
Living people
Musicians from Worcester, England
Alumni of St John's College, Cambridge
English conductors (music)
British male conductors (music)
English classical organists
British male organists
Academics of the University of East Anglia
Cathedral organists
21st-century British conductors (music)
21st-century organists
21st-century British male musicians
Male classical organists